Paul Drake may refer to:

Paul Drake (character), a fictional private detective in the Perry Mason novels and TV series
Paul Drake (actor), American actor in the 1983 film Sudden Impact
Paul Drake, suspect in the kidnapping of Shannon Matthews